Dendrolimus superans, also called the white-lined silk moth, Sakhalin silk moth, Japanese hemlock caterpillar, Siberian silk moth, Siberian moth, Siberian conifer silk moth, Siberian lasiocampid or larch caterpillar, is a moth of the family Lasiocampidae.

Distribution
It is found in Kazakhstan, Mongolia, China, Russia, Korea and Japan.

Description
The wingspan is 60–102 mm. The colour ranges from light yellowish brown or light grey to dark brown or almost black. The forewings are crossed by two dark stripes and there is a white spot situated at the centre of the forewing.

Life cycle
The length of the life cycle varies from two to four calendar years depending on population density. The larvae of the males have five to nine instars, while those of the females have six to ten. Adults are on wing from the end of June to the beginning of August. The larvae (second to third instars and fifth to sixth instars) overwinter under the forest litter. Pupation takes place from mid-June to late July. There are cycles of slow build up of population over several years, reaching a peak (outbreak) followed by a population collapse.

Host plants and damage
The larvae feed on Larix, Picea and Pinus species. It is the major defoliator of coniferous forests in Asian Russia.

Subspecies
Dendrolimus superans superans - white-lined silk moth, Sakhalin silk moth, Japanese hemlock caterpillar (Sakhalin, the Kurile Islands and northern Japan)
Dendrolimus superans sibiricus Tschetverikov, 1908 - Siberian silk moth, Siberian moth, Siberian conifer silk moth, Siberian lasiocampid or larch caterpillar (north eastern Kazakhstan, Urals, Siberia and the Far East)

Gallery

References

External links
Species Profile - Siberian Moth (Dendrolimus sibiricus), National Invasive Species Information Center, United States National Agricultural Library. 
 Invasive Species Compendium, CAB International

Lasiocampidae
Moths described in 1877
Moths of Asia